Mr. Fox is a 2011 novel by British author Helen Oyeyemi, published by Picador in the UK and by Riverhead Books in the US.

In an interview with Bookforum, Oyeyemi talked about Mr. Fox's relationship to her other work, saying: "Then there are the books that are like games. Mr. Fox and What Is Not Yours Is Not Yours fit in there. And I think those are the ones that I love—the ones I think are useless and not contributing anything. Because of that desire to be happy, and that desire to play, but also, they feel like my own, and not just projects. These are the books where I feel I’m developing toward something, some style. And then I can tell a story that isn’t even a retelling but is my own thing. I’m curious to see what that will be like when I get there."

Plot 
Mr. Fox is a beloved writer with a bad habit. He can't stop killing the heroines in his novels in most diabolical fashions. Mary wants to help, as much for Mr. Fox's sake as for the sake of the women in his stories. The complication is that Mary isn't exactly real; she's Mr. Fox's muse and a creation of his mind. But this doesn't stop Mary from challenging Mr. Fox to a game of stories where he becomes both author and subject. Meanwhile, Mr. Fox's wife Daphne is being neglected, and as her husband spends even more time in his study than usual she begins to suspect something is wrong, and that he may possibly even be having an affair. Ultimately, Daphne forces her own way into Mr. Fox and Mary's game.

Mr. Fox is forced to choose between a world of pure imagination with a not-quite-real muse who he loves nonetheless, and his very real wife who he is always forgetting just how much he loves.

Reception 
The Guardian wrote "Oyeyemi breathes life into ideas like nobody else." From a review in NPR: "Oyeyemi exuberantly opens doors into other realms, minds and eras — and uncovers beautiful truths at every twisted turn."

Anita Sethi, writing in The Observer, called the novel "a meditation on the writing process itself, filled vignettes about how language may ensnare or liberate."

Aimee Bender, writing in The New York Times, wrote "Oyeyemi casts her word-spell, sentence by sentence, story by story, and by the end, the oppressive lair has opened up into a shimmering landscape pulsing with life."

In a mixed review, The Washington Post concluded, "In “Mr. Fox,” however, what she does not do — and doesn’t seem to have any intention of doing — is make it all cohere."

References 

2011 British novels
English-language novels
Novels by Helen Oyeyemi
Picador (imprint) books